L'Infermiera is a 1975 commedia sexy all'italiana film starring Ursula Andress, Jack Palance and Luciana Paluzzi, also known by the titles I Will If You Will, The Nurse, The Sensuous Nurse and The Secrets of a Sensuous Nurse.

Plot

As an aging widower begins suffering from heart trouble, his greedy heirs hope to speed him on his way by hiring a seductive nurse (Andress) to get his pulse racing. Their plan eventually backfires as the young beauty begins to fall in love with the old man.

An aging widower who owns successful winery, Leonida Bottacin, has a severe heart attack during a sexual liaison with another man's wife. Leonida's relatives hope to inherit the winery to sell it to American business interests. On learning from the physician that a second heart attack will be fatal, Leonida's son-in-law Benito hires his ex-girlfriend Anna, a very attractive nurse, to attend to Leonida. Benito hopes that Leonida will be sufficiently excited by Anna's beauty and sensuality to suffer a deadly heart attack.

Despite Benito's plans, Anna takes excellent care of Leonida and eventually falls in love with him. Eventually Leonida recovers and marries Anna, crushing the hopes of his relatives for a quick inheritance. To protect her new husband's health, Anna plans for a celibate marriage. However, Leonida insists on having sex on their honeymoon and dies as a result. Anna inherits his assets and uses part of her husband's fortune to provide him with a grand funeral.

Cast 
 Ursula Andress as Anna
 Jack Palance as Mr. Kitch
 Luciana Paluzzi as Jole Scarpa
 Duilio Del Prete as Benito Varotto
 Mario Pisu as Leonida Bottacin
 Daniele Vargas as Gustavo Scarpa
 Carla Romanelli as Tosca Floria Zanin
 Marina Confalone as Italia Varotto
 Stefano Sabelli as Adone
 Lino Toffolo as Giovanni Garbin
 Attilio Duse as Doctor Pavan

External links
 

1975 films
1970s Italian-language films
1970s sex comedy films
Commedia sexy all'italiana
Films about nurses
Films produced by Carlo Ponti
Films directed by Nello Rossati
1975 comedy films
1970s Italian films